The 2019 Internationaux de France was the third event of the 2019–20 ISU Grand Prix of Figure Skating, a senior-level international invitational competition series. It was held at Patinoire Polesud in Grenoble, France from November 1–3. Medals were awarded in the disciplines of men's singles, ladies' singles, pair skating, and ice dance. Skaters earned points toward qualifying for the 2019–20 Grand Prix Final.

Entries
The ISU announced the preliminary assignments on June 20, 2019.

Changes to preliminary assignments

Records

The following new ISU best scores were set during this competition:

Results

Men

Ladies

Pairs

Ice dance

The rhythm dance scores for the last two teams, Marie-Jade Lauriault / Romain Le Gac of France and Allison Reed / Saulius Ambrulevičius of Lithuania, were revised several hours after the event due to an unspecified error.

References

Internationaux de France
Internationaux de France
Internationaux de France
Internationaux de France
Sports competitions in Grenoble